Tingena falsiloqua is a species of moth in the family Oecophoridae. It is endemic to New Zealand and has been collected in the North Island. This species frequents subalpine native forest.

Taxonomy 
This species was first described by Edward Meyrick in 1932 using specimen collected at Waimarino at an altitude of 2500 ft in January by George Hudson and named Trachypepla falsiloqua. George Hudson discussed this species under the name Trachypepla falsiloqua in his 1939 publication A supplement to the butterflies and moths of New Zealand. In 1988 J. S. Dugdale placed this species in the genus Tingena. The male holotype specimen is held at the Natural History Museum, London.

Description
This species was described by Meyrick as follows:
Hudson, in 1939, raised the possibility that this moth might be a form of the variable T. innotella however Dugdale retained this species in his 1988 paper.

Distribution
T. falsiloqua is endemic to New Zealand.

Habitat 
This species frequents subalpine native forest.

References

Oecophoridae
Moths of New Zealand
Moths described in 1932
Endemic fauna of New Zealand
Taxa named by Edward Meyrick
Endemic moths of New Zealand